State Route 116 (SR 116) is a state highway in Churchill County, Nevada, United States. Known as Stillwater Road, it connects the small town of Stillwater to U.S. Route 50 (US 50) east of Fallon. The road was established by 1940 as SR 42, and was renumbered to SR 116 in 1976.

Route description

SR 116 is a two-lane roadway that traverses through a combination of agricultural and desert terrain in the Lahontan Valley. From there, the road travels in a northeasterly direction, stair-stepping easterly and northerly through farm plots. For a short distance, the route forms is part of the southern boundary of  the Fallon Paiute-Shoshone Indian Reservation. After , the road reaches the small town of Stillwater. SR 116 reaches its eastern terminus on the eastern edge of the town, but Stillwater Road continues east towards the Stillwater Point Reservoir and the Stillwater National Wildlife Refuge.

History
A paved road approximating the current alignment of Stillwater Road was constructed by 1939. At that time, the road had a western terminus in Fallon. By 1940, the road was assigned the designation of State Route 42 on the official state map. By 1960, the western end of SR 42 was truncated to its current western terminus at present-day US 50, concurrent with the shift of US 50 to the current alignment which leaves downtown Fallon in an eastward direction.

The highway did not see any further changes until the 1976 renumbering of Nevada's state highway system on July 1, 1976. In that process, SR 42 was renumbered to State Route 116. This change was first seen on the official state highway map in 1978. The route has remained relatively unchanged since.

Major intersections

See also

 List of state highways in Nevada

References

External links

116
Transportation in Churchill County, Nevada